Stop Laughing...This Is Serious is a conversational-style Australian television documentary program which debuted in 2015 on the ABC. The first season of three episodes is narrated by Eric Bana and features 63 well-known comedians and actors who analyse the history of comedy in Australia and relive their own experiences. It includes Barry Humphries, Andrew Denton, Adam Hills, Shaun Micallef, Garry McDonald, Magda Szubanski and Paul Hogan. The second season, narrated by Colin Lane, screened in 2017. Its title references a famous 1933 cartoon by Stan Cross.

Episodes

Season 1
 Episode 1 Faark, Faark 
 Episode 2 Look At Moi, Look At Moi 
 Episode 3 Hello Possums 

Narrator: Eric Bana
Participants: Adam Hills, Andrew Denton, Andrew Knight, Austen Tayshus, Barry Humphries, Chris Taylor, Christiaan Van Vuuren, Colin Lane, Craig Reucassel, Dave Hughes, Denise Scott, Frank Woodley, Garry McDonald, Gary Reilly, Glenn Robbins, Graeme Blundell, Grahame Bond, Greig Pickhaver, Ian McFadyen, Jane Turner, John Clarke, John Doyle, John Pinder, John Safran, Judith Lucy, Julia Morris, Julia Zemiro, Kevin Kropinyeri, Lawrence Mooney, Libbi Gorr, Magda Szubanski, Mary Coustas, Mary Kenneally, Mick Molloy, Mikey Robins, Nazeem Hussain, Neill Gladwin, Nicholas Boshier, Nick Giannopoulos, Noeline Brown, Paul Fenech, Paul Hogan, Paul McDermott, Richard Fidler, Rod Quantock, Rodney Rude, Rove McManus, Santo Cilauro, Sean Choolburra, Shane Bourne, Shane Jacobson, Shaun Micallef, Steve Kearney, Steve Vizard, Sue Ingleton, Susan Provan, Tim Ferguson, Tim Minchin, Tom Ballard, Toni Lamond, Tony Martin, Tony Sattler, and Wendy Harmer

Season 2
 Episode 1 She Goes... She Goes... She Just Goes 
 Episode 2 I Said Pet, I Said Pet, I said Love 
 Episode 3 Too Much Variety Is Barely Enough

See also
 The Agony of...

References

External links
  at ABC

2000s Australian television series
2015 Australian television series debuts
Australian Broadcasting Corporation original programming
Australian non-fiction television series
English-language television shows
Television series by Screentime